Robert M. McClintock (August 30, 1909 – November 1, 1976) was an American diplomat. A career Foreign Service Officer, he served as the U.S. Ambassador to Cambodia (1954–1956), Lebanon (1957–1961), Argentina (1962–1964), and Venezuela (1970–1975).

McClintock was born in Seattle, Washington on August 30, 1909. He joined the Foreign Service in 1931 after graduating from Stanford University. Other positions include Advisor to the President of the Naval War College (1964 to 1966) and Deputy Director Special State-Defense Study Group beginning in 1968.

McClintock died of injuries sustained in a car crash in Beaune, France, on November 1, 1976. He was 67 years old.

Venezuela and oil
Venezuela was the largest supplier of oil to the US, in 1974.  In 1975, they were taking steps to nationalize the industry. He took his concerns to the American Government, fearful “Venezuela could play one American oil company off against another. ... McClintock reportedly wanted the United States Government to take on a major and direct role in negotiations concerning prices, levels of production and the share that would be channelled through American companies to the United States market.”

References

1909 births
1976 deaths
20th-century American diplomats
Stanford University alumni
Ambassadors of the United States to Argentina
Ambassadors of the United States to Venezuela
Ambassadors of the United States to Cambodia
Ambassadors of the United States to Lebanon